Floyd Hugh Pease (June 27, 1898 – November 11, 1983) was an American schoolteacher, farmer, and politician who served in the Wyoming House of Representatives from 1967 to 1973. He was previously Goshen County treasurer for 24 years.

Pease was married twice: first to Huldah Johnson on June 3, 1927 and second to Lois Rentz Persson on April 14, 1973. He had two children by his first wife.

References

1898 births
1983 deaths
Republican Party members of the Wyoming House of Representatives
United States Army personnel of World War I
University of Nebraska at Kearney alumni
20th-century American politicians